Sairang is a town in the Aizawl district of the Indian state of Mizoram.

History
After the British invasion of 1871-1872, Bengali traders set up the first market place in Mizoram in Changsil on the tlawng river, when the British established control in the 1890s, the market moved up to Sairang. According to Administration report of 1922, there were 13 shops in Sairang.
Up to the 1940s the road from Aizawl to Sairang was only a cart road. Improvement of the road started only in 1896.

Sairang is the nearest town with river from Aizawl which is about 14 kilometers. The journey of about 140 Kilometers from Sairang to Silchar via Tlawng river used to take about 15–30 days during the 1890s depending upon the season and water level on a flat water boat.

Geography
It has an average elevation of 210 metres (688 feet).

Connectivity
Sairang lies on the route of Kaladan Multi-Modal Transit Transport Project. It is connected with roads from major towns in Assam, through NH 54. The nearest railway station is at Bairabi, which is connected to the railway network with a broad gauge track. A new broad gauge line from Bairabi to Sairang is under construction. Due to several delays in construction work, and due to COVID-19 pandemic-related lockdowns and lack of labour, the revised deadline of the rail line to Sairang, and the final extension till Mizoram's capital Aizawl, is likely to be completed by March 2023.

Survey for the Rail line from Sairang to Hmawngbuchhuah on border near Zorinpui was completed in August 2017 and it will be constructed in future phase.

 route from Indo-Myanmar border at Zorinpui to Aizawl is upgraded to two-lane in  both directions (total 4 lanes). From Aizal it connect to Aizawal-Saiha National Highway at Lawngtlai in Mizoram in India by road on National Highway 54 (India) (NH-54), which then continues further to Dabaka in Assam via 850 km long NH-54 which in turn is part of the larger East-West Corridor connecting North East India with the rest of India. Almost complete (June 2017). Tender has been awarded, upgrade to this national highway is under-construction and to be Completed by 2019.

Demographics
Males constitute 50.3% of the population and females 49.7%. Sairang has an average literacy rate of 97.9%. In Sairang, 16.5% of the population was under 6 years of age.

References

Aizawl
Cities and towns in Aizawl district